The men's 100 metre freestyle event at the 1972 Olympic Games took place between September 2 and 3. There were 48 competitors from 29 nations. Nations had been limited to three swimmers each since the 1924 Games (except in 1960, when the limit was two). The event was won by Mark Spitz of the United States, his then-record sixth gold medal in a single Games (he would add a seventh in the medley relay, for a record that stood until Michael Phelps won eight in 2008). It was the ninth victory in the event for an American, most of any nation. Jerry Heidenreich, also of the United States, took silver. Soviet swimmer Vladimir Bure (father of future hockey hall of famer Pavel Bure) earned bronze, the nation's first medal in the men's 100 metre freestyle.

Background

This was the 16th appearance of the men's 100 metre freestyle. The event has been held at every Summer Olympics except 1900 (when the shortest freestyle was the 200 metres), though the 1904 version was measured in yards rather than metres.

Three of the eight finalists from the 1968 Games returned: gold medalist Michael Wenden of Australia, bronze medalist Mark Spitz of the United States, and sixth-place finisher Georgijs Kuļikovs of the Soviet Union. Spitz had already won five gold medals in 1972, matching the record, and had two events left: the 100 metre freestyle and the medley relay. The American team was not expected to have any difficulty with the relay, so this event was the last one in which there was any substantial drama as to whether Spitz could take 7 gold medals in Munich. Spitz, who had set the world record at the U.S. trials, was favored, though fellow American Jerry Heidenreich was a serious contender, as were Wenden and the Soviet team.

Cambodia (then Khmer Republic), Kuwait, and New Zealand each made their debut in the event; East Germany competed separately for the first time. The United States made its 16th appearance, having competed at each edition of the event to date.

Competition format

The competition used a three-round (heats, semifinals, final) format. The advancement rule mostly followed the format introduced in 1952, though the number of semifinals was reduced from 3 to 2 and qualification for the final was done via place with wild cards in the semifinals. Swim-offs were used as necessary to break ties.

A swimmer's place in the heat was not used to determine advancement; instead, the fastest times from across all heats in a round were used. There were 7 heats scheduled, with 7 or 8 swimmers each. Due to withdrawals, some heats had as few as 6 swimmers. The top 16 swimmers advanced to the semifinals.

There were 2 semifinals of 8 swimmers each. The top 3 swimmers in each semifinal as well as the next 2 fastest swimmers advanced to the final.

This swimming event used freestyle swimming, which means that the method of the stroke is not regulated (unlike backstroke, breaststroke, and butterfly events). Nearly all swimmers use the front crawl or a variant of that stroke. Because an Olympic size swimming pool is 50 metres long, this race consisted of two lengths of the pool.

For the first time at the Olympics, times were reported to the hundredths of a second.

Records

These were the standing world and Olympic records (in seconds) prior to the 1972 Summer Olympics.

Mark Spitz broke the world record in the final, swimming in 51.22 seconds. This also set a new record for most gold medals in a single Olympics, with six.

Schedule

All times are Central European Time (UTC+1)

Results

Heats

The 16 fastest swimmers from seven heats advanced to the semifinals.

Semifinals

The top three swimmers in each semifinal and the next two fastest overall advanced to the final.

Semifinal 1

Semifinal 2

Final

Spitz started fast, surprising Heidenreich. Heidenreich gave chase and closed during the final stretch, but was unable to catch Spitz.

References

Men's freestyle 100 metre
Men's events at the 1972 Summer Olympics